A Donkey, 3 Rocks, and a Bird., also known as Donkey, Bird and Rocks and Donkey, Three Rocks, and a Bird, is an outdoor 1992 sculpture by Brad Rude, installed at Catlin Gabel School in West Haven-Sylvan, a census-designated place in Washington County and the Portland metropolitan area, in the U.S. state of Oregon.

Description and history 
Brad Rude's A Donkey, 3 Rocks, and a Bird. (1992), installed at Catlin Gabel School between the Lower School's science room and the Art Barn, is a cast bronze and stone sculpture depicting a life-size donkey and a bird facing one another. The donkey has a rock balanced on its back, while the bird is both standing on a rock and balancing one on its head. The donkey has surfaces decorations, including glyphs and figures, and is coated in polychrome bronze. The bird is coated in blue, green, orange, red and yellow. The sculpture measures approximately  x  x . Its base is made of exposed aggregate concrete and measures approximately  x  x . One plaque on the base reads, . Another reads, . Inscriptions near the donkey's crotch displays the artist's last name, a copyright symbol, and the year of completion, plus the founder's mark for Will Willie. The Smithsonian Institution describes the work as abstract. Its condition was deemed "well maintained" by Smithsonian's "Save Outdoor Sculpture!" program in November 1993.

See also 

 1992 in art
 Elkhorn (sculpture), a 1979 sculpture by Lee Kelly installed at Catlin Gabel

References

External links 
 Public Commissions at Brad Rude's official website

1992 establishments in Oregon
1992 sculptures
Abstract sculptures in Oregon
Animal sculptures in Oregon
Bronze sculptures in Oregon
Donkeys in art
Outdoor sculptures in Oregon
Sculptures of birds in Oregon
Statues in Oregon
Stone sculptures in Oregon
Stone statues
West Haven-Sylvan, Oregon